The Communist Party of Lithuania is  a banned communist party in Lithuania. The party was established in early October 1918 and operated clandestinely until it was legalized by Soviet authorities in 1940. The party was banned in August 1991, following the coup attempt in Moscow, Soviet Union which later led to the collapse of the Soviet Union and the dissolution of the Lithuanian SSR.

History
The party was working illegally from 1920 until 1940. Although the party was illegal, some of its members took part in the 1922 Lithuanian parliamentary election under title "Workers Groups". It managed to gather 5.0 per cent of vote (or around 40,000 votes) and elect five members. Due to political instability, Seimas was dissolved and new elections took place in 1923. In these elections, the party lost half of its support.

In 1940 the party amalgamated with the Communist Party of the Soviet Union (Bolsheviks). By the time of the formation of the Lithuanian SSR, the Communist Party of Lithuania (LKP) was headed by Antanas Sniečkus. In 1940, the LKP merged into the CPSU(b). The territorial organisation of the party in Lithuania was called Communist Party of Lithuania (bolshevik) (LKP (b)). In the Lithuanian territorial organisation, the first secretary of the Central Committee of the party (always a Lithuanian) was de facto ruler of the country. The second secretary for the most of Soviet era was a Moscow-appointed Russian. In 1952 the name of the old Lithuanian party, LKP, was re-adopted.

On 24 December 1989, during mass protests of the Singing Revolution against the Soviet Union in Lithuania, the party declared itself independent from Communist Party of the Soviet Union. By 1990, the main body of the CPL reorganized as the Democratic Labour Party of Lithuania, which in turn by 2001 merged with Social Democratic Party of Lithuania under the latter's name; but with leadership dominated by ex-communists.

A small portion of the party remained loyal to the CPSU, and reorganized as the Communist Party of Lithuania ('on platform of Communist Party of the Soviet Union') under the leadership of Mykolas Burokevičius after the "traditional" party declared independence from its Soviet Union counterpart. The party played a major role in the January 1991 Events in Lithuania and initiating the creation of the National Salvation Committee. The Communist Party of Lithuania was eventually banned on 23 August 1991. The party remains illegal in Lithuania, and is affiliated with the Union of Communist Parties — Communist Party of the Soviet Union (UCP-CPSU) headed by Gennady Zyuganov.

Membership

Governance

First Secretaries

Second Secretaries
Icikas Meskupas-Adomas (9 February 1941 – 13 March 1942)
Vladas Niunka (April – 30 December 1944)
Alexander Isachenko (30 December 1944 – 24 November 1946)
Alexander Trofimov (24 November 1946 – 22 September 1952)
Vasily Aronov (25 September 1952 – 11 June 1953)
Motiejus Šumauskas (February 1954 – 24 January 1956)
Boris Sharkov (28 January 1956 – 27 September 1961)
Boris Popov (30 September 1961 – 13 April 1967)
Valery Khazarov (13 April 1967 – 10 December 1978)
Nikolay Dubenko (11 December 1978 – 17 September 1986)
Nikolay Mitkin (17 September 1986 – 9 December 1988)
Vladimir Beryozov (9 December 1988 – 1990)

Congresses

See also
 Communist Party (Bolsheviks) of Lithuania and Belorussia

References

Organizations of the Revolutions of 1989
Communist parties in the Soviet Union
Banned communist parties
Lithuania
Parties of one-party systems
Communist parties in Lithuania
Lithuanian collaborators with the Soviet Union (1940–41)
Lithuania
Political parties established in 1918
Political parties disestablished in 1991
Defunct political parties in Lithuania
1918 establishments in Lithuania
1991 disestablishments in Lithuania
Lithuanian Soviet Socialist Republic
Singing Revolution